is a Japanese voice actress from Saga Prefecture who is affiliated with 81 Produce. She is known for her roles as Sora Kaneshiro in Angel's 3Piece!, Yuri Miyata in Two Car, Paimon in Genshin Impact, Kaguya Shinomiya in Kaguya-sama: Love Is War, and Shoko Komi in Komi Can't Communicate. She was also part of the musical group Baby's Breath together with the other main cast members of Angel's 3Piece!.

Biography
Koga had an interest in anime since her childhood, watching series such as Cardcaptor Sakura and Ojamajo Doremi. She first became interested in voice acting after watching the television program Okaasan to Issho and becoming fond of the puppet segments featured in the show. This made her want to "become friends with dolls" and, along with her interest in anime, helped her decide to pursue a career in entertainment.

In pursuit of becoming a voice actress, Koga would take acting lessons at a vocational school in Fukuoka. Following this, she enrolled in the training school of the agency 81 Produce, becoming affiliated with them upon her finishing her training. Her first credited role in an anime was a woman in Rokka: Braves of the Six Flowers. In 2017, she was cast as the character Sora Kaneshiro in Angel's 3Piece!; she also became part of the band Baby's Breath along with Yuko Ono and Yurika Endō, her co-stars in the series. She was later cast as Yuri Miyata in Two Car, where she performed the series' ending theme "Angelica Wind" together with her co-star Aimi Tanaka. In 2019, she played the role of Kaguya Shinomiya in Kaguya-sama: Love Is War, for which she won Best Actress in a Leading Role at the 14th Seiyu Awards. She also made a cameo in the live-action film adaptation of Kaguya-sama: Love is War.

Filmography

Anime
2015
Jewelpet: Magical Change
Rokka: Braves of the Six Flowers as Woman
Owarimonogatari as Classmate
Beautiful Bones: Sakurako's Investigation as Mari

2016
Beyblade Burst as Momoko Ogi
JoJo's Bizarre Adventure: Diamond Is Unbreakable as Akemi
Aikatsu Stars! as Airi Amemiya, Umi Kaiyama, and Yuri Ashida
Kiznaiver as Female student
Shounen Ashibe GO! GO! Goma-chan as Yumiko-chan
Haven't You Heard? I'm Sakamoto as Schoolgirl
Naria Girls as Hanabi

2017
Beyblade Burst God as Honey Guten
Angel's 3Piece! as Sora Kaneshiro
Two Car as Yuri Miyata

2018
Zombieland Saga as Maria Amabuki

2019
Kaguya-sama: Love Is War as Kaguya Shinomiya
The Magnificent Kotobuki as Betty
Fairy Gone as Chima
Demon Slayer: Kimetsu no Yaiba as Rokuta Kamado
Wise Man's Grandchild as Christina Hayden
A Certain Scientific Accelerator as Naru
Cautious Hero: The Hero Is Overpowered but Overly Cautious as Elulu
Kemono Michi: Rise Up as Ceris
The Demon Girl Next Door as Dog Lady

2020
Asteroid in Love as Sayuri Ibe
Kaguya-sama: Love Is War? as Kaguya Shinomiya
A Certain Scientific Railgun T as Naru
Super HxEros as Chiya Hoya

2021
Full Dive as Kaede Yūki
How Not to Summon a Demon Lord Ω as Rose
Zombie Land Saga Revenge as Maria Amabuki
Remake Our Life! as Aki Shino
Blue Period as Yamamoto
Komi Can't Communicate as Shouko Komi
My Senpai Is Annoying as Mona Tsukishiro
Build Divide -#00000 (Code Black)- as Hiyori Tori
180-Byō de Kimi no Mimi o Shiawase ni Dekiru ka? as Kanako

2022
Build Divide -#00000 (Code White)- as Hiyori Tori
In the Heart of Kunoichi Tsubaki as Ajisai
Kaguya-sama: Love Is War – Ultra Romantic as Kaguya Shinomiya
Shine Post as Natalya
To Your Eternity 2nd Season as Pocoa
Beast Tamer as Mina

2023
Soaring Sky! Pretty Cure as El
Dekoboko Majo no Oyako Jijō as Alissa
Synduality as Noir

Anime films
2021
 Princess Principal: Crown Handler as Ange
2022
 Kaguya-sama: Love Is War – The First Kiss That Never Ends as Kaguya Shinomiya
2023
 Fate/strange Fake: Whispers of Dawn as Tsubaki Kuruoka

Original net animation (ONA) 
2021
Cute Executive Officer as Nowani
2022
Kakegurui Twin as Mikura Sado
2023
Cute Executive Officer R as Nowani

Live-action film
2019
 Kaguya-sama: Love Is War as Movie Theater Staff

Live-action television
2021
 Voice: 110 Emergency Control Room 2 as Tomoko Murata

Dubbing
2020
 Thomas & Friends as Gabriela, Darcy and Cleo

2022
 Link Click as Qiao Ling/Rin

Commercials
Toyota Raize as Luna

Video games
2016
 Girls' Frontline as FNP-9 and M950A
2019
 Honkai Impact 3rd as Rozaliya Olenyeva
 Dragalia Lost as Catherine 
2020
 Genshin Impact as Paimon
 Granblue Fantasy as Mireille
 Dead or Alive Xtreme Venus Vacation as Lobelia
2021
 Action Taimanin as Noah Brown
 Azur Lane as Nicoloso da Recco
 Alchemy Stars as Pact
 Cookie Run: Kingdom as Pastry Cookie
 Magia Record as Kush Irina
 Maplestory as Lara
2022
 Heaven Burns Red as Tama Kunimi
 Fate Grand Order as Kriemhild
 Sword Art Online: Integral Factor as Sanya
 The Legend of Heroes: Kuro no Kiseki II – Crimson Sin as Jolda
 Xenoblade Chronicles 3 as Ino
2023
 Da Capo 5 as Kako Yasaka
 Loop8: Summer of Gods as Ichika

References

External links
Official agency profile 

1993 births
81 Produce voice actors
Living people
Japanese video game actresses
Japanese voice actresses
Voice actresses from Saga Prefecture